Edith Helen Sichel was an English author, sister of Walter Sichel. She was born on 13 December 1862, in London, to Jewish migrants from Germany who converted to Christianity, and educated at home by private teachers.  

She died on 13 August 1914 in Carnforth (Lancashire).

Bibliography 

 Two Salons (1895)
 The Household of the Lafayettes (1897)
 Women and Men of the French Renaissance (1901)
 Catherine de' Medici and the French Reformation (1905); 
 Life and Letters of Alfred Ainger (1906)
 The Later Years of Catherine de' Medici (1908)
 Michel de Montaigne (1911)
 The Renaissance (1914)

References

External links
 
 

1862 births
1914 deaths
English Jewish writers
English biographers
English women non-fiction writers
Jewish women writers
20th-century English women writers
20th-century English writers
19th-century English women writers
Women biographers
Writers from London
English people of German-Jewish descent
20th-century biographers
19th-century biographers